Conservation Letters is a bimonthly peer-reviewed open access scientific journal of the Society for Conservation Biology published by Wiley-Blackwell. It was established in 2008 and covers research on all aspects of conservation biology. The editor-in-chief is Edward T. Game.

Abstracting and indexing
The journal is abstracted and indexed in:
Biological Abstracts
BIOSIS Previews
CAB Abstracts
Current Contents/Agriculture, Biology & Environmental Sciences
EBSCO databases
Science Citation Index Expanded
Scopus
Veterinary Science Database
The Zoological Record
According to the Journal Citation Reports, the journal has a 2020 impact factor of 8.105.

References

External links

Wiley-Blackwell academic journals
Publications established in 2008
Bimonthly journals
Creative Commons Attribution-licensed journals
English-language journals
Ecology journals